Sekolah Laboratorium Unsyiah, also known as SMA Labschool Unsyiah is a community-based school that is a part of the Universitas Syiah Kuala complex in Banda Aceh, Aceh, Indonesia.

Background 
After the devastating 2004 Indian Ocean earthquake and tsunami hit Banda Aceh in 2004, USINDO (The United States-Indonesia Society) built the school for children who were victims of the disaster.

SMA Labschool was inaugurated on 27 July 2007 by the rector of Universitas Syiah Kuala, Head of BRR Aceh-Nias, and common-head of United States-Indonesia Society (USINDO) Edward Masters and Arifin Siregar. The school was designed by an architect from Syiah Kuala University. On 5 June 2005, Pemerintah Provinsi Aceh through Dinas Pendidikan issued operational approval of SMA Laboratorium Universitas Syiah Kuala.

In October 2010, three years after its opening ceremony, SMA Labschool Unsyiah was appointed to be one of Rintisan Sekolah Bertaraf Internasional.

Facilities 
 Laboratories for Physics, Chemistry and Biology,
 Computer Lab with 24 Linux computers and one server to perform e-learning with Moodle,
 Library. On 28 January 2010, United States Ambassador for Indonesia, Cameron R. Hume visited SMA Labschool to donate US$100,000 to further develop the library.
 Arts Lab equipped with musical instruments, including a drum kit, an electronic keyboard, electric guitars, and a bass guitar. Such instruments are rare and almost cannot be found in public schools in Aceh.
 An internet wi-fi zone which can be accessed by students from 8 am to 4 pm daily.

Learning-teaching system 
Labschool Unsyiah implements a learning and teaching system that is slightly different from other high schools in Aceh. One of them is the 'moving class' system. Students transfer to another class each time their class is finished. This creates different surroundings everyday and prevents students from becoming bored with a static atmosphere in school.

SMA Lab School Unsyiah implements 2006 competency-based curriculum (KBK).

School hours 
Classes are conducted from Monday to Friday 7.45 AM to 4 pm. On Saturday, students attend extracurricular activities.

Sports clubs 
 Boys' basketball
 Girls' volleyball

	
Labschool basketball team was formed in 2008, led by Agung Dwi Satriawan. The highest achievement of the first team was to be the 4th in an inter-high basketball competition hosted by SMAN 7 Banda Aceh in 2009. Labschool lost when competing the title of 3rd winner to SMAN 1 Banda Aceh, after winning over MAN Model Banda Aceh, 20–0. The next team was led by Faizin Risa.

Donors 
The following are individual and private/non-private/NGOs/non-NGOs organisations which helped the establishment and operation of SMA Labschool Unsyiah.

NGO/non-NGO organisations
 Newmont Mining Corporation
 AIG Disaster Relief Fund
 AmCham Indonesia
 American Standard Companies, Indonesia
 BI Perbankan Peduli Indonesia
 Boeing Company melalui United Way International
 Caterpillar Inc. Foundation
 PT Trakindo
 Coca-Cola – US Asean Business Council Disaster Relief and Renewal Fund
 Credit Renaissance Partners
 Do Something
 Bank Danamon Peduli Aceh
 ExxonMobil Foundation
 Freeman Foundation via Sampoerna Foundation
 PT Freeport Indonesia
 General Electric Indonesia
 Greenville and Seely Place Elementary School, Scarsdale, New York
 IBM Indonesia and Cisco Indonesia
 Jakarta International School, Jakarta
 PT Mitra Timur Lestari
 Rolls-Royce
 Rotary Club Indonesia and Rotarians from South Africa
 Schlumberger UKC

Private donors 

 Mark Dion
 David and Helen Kenney
 AR Ramly dan keluarga
 Ruth and Julian Schroeder
 Chapman Taylor
 The Taylor family
 Carr W Dornsife
 Philip and Bess Sullivan
 Gerald and Louise Winfield

Footnotes 

Buildings and structures in Aceh
Schools in Indonesia
Education in Aceh